USS Invade (AM-254) was an  built for the United States Navy during World War II. She served in the Pacific during World War II. She was decommissioned in August 1946 and placed in reserve. While she remained in reserve, Invade was reclassified as MSF-254 in February 1955 but never reactivated. In August 1962, she was sold to the Mexican Navy and renamed ARM DM-18. In 1994 she was renamed ARM General Ignacio Zaragoza (C60). She was stricken in July 2001, but her ultimate fate is not reported in secondary sources.

U.S. Navy career 
Invade was laid down 19 January 1944 by Savannah Machine & Foundry Co., Savannah, Georgia; launched 6 February 1944; sponsored by Miss Thayer C. Allen; and commissioned 18 September 1944. After shakedown in Chesapeake Bay, Invade steamed to Casco Bay, Maine, for training 24 November 1944. Following these operations and additional drills out of Norfolk, Virginia, the minecraft assumed duties there as towing ship for aircraft targets and as an experimental minesweeper. She remained on this important duty through the end of the war and reported 21 September 1945 to the Mine Warfare School at Yorktown, Virginia, as a training ship.

Invade decommissioned 7 August 1946 and joined the Atlantic Reserve Fleet at Orange, Texas. She was reclassified MSF-254 on 7 February 1955, and struck from the Naval Vessel Register on 1 May 1962. She was sold to Mexico on 30 August 1962.

Mexican Navy career 
The former Invade was acquired by the Mexican Navy in August 1962 and renamed ARM DM-18. In 1994, she was renamed ARM General Ignacio Zaragoza (C60) after Ignacio Zaragoza. She was stricken on 16 July 2001, but her ultimate fate is not reported in secondary sources.

Notes

References 
 
 NavSource Online: Mine Warfare Vessel Photo Archive - Invade (MSF 254) - ex-AM-254

Admirable-class minesweepers
Ships built in Savannah, Georgia
1944 ships
World War II minesweepers of the United States
Admirable-class minesweepers of the Mexican Navy